Thomas Edwin Jarriel (pronounced "Jair-ell," with a silent "i"; born December 29, 1934) is a retired American television news reporter who worked for the ABC network from 1964 to 2002.

Jarriel's parents were the late William Lester Jarriel, Sr., and Ella Ruth Jarriel. They had six children, including Tom. In 1947, the family moved to Shreveport, where Jarriel graduated in 1952 from C.E. Byrd High School. In 1956, he earned a Bachelor of Science degree at the University of Houston. He first worked at television station KPRC-TV, the NBC affiliate in Houston. In 1965, Jarriel joined ABC, first based at the network's southern bureau in Atlanta, Georgia. While there, he attracted national notice for his coverage of the assassination of Martin Luther King Jr.

Shortly afterward, he became White House correspondent for ABC, during the administrations of U.S. Presidents Richard Nixon and Gerald Ford. Later, in 1977, Jarriel co-anchored ABC Evening News on Saturdays for two years, and in 1979, joined the network's newsmagazine 20/20, as an investigative correspondent. On that show and on several hour-long documentaries, he covered subjects such as the defects in the American criminal justice system, wasteful spending by the United States Department of Defense, and transportation accidents. He received 10 Emmy Awards for his work.

During most of that time, Jarriel anchored the 15-minute bulletins ABC aired late nights on Saturday and Sunday, until those broadcasts were cancelled in 1991; he was also the most frequent anchor of the daytime ABC News Brief updates that aired during the era. He also served as substitute anchor on World News Tonight.

He retired from broadcasting in 2002.

References

External links
 ABC News profile of Tom Jarriel

1934 births
Living people
ABC News personalities
American television news anchors
American television reporters and correspondents
People from LaGrange, Georgia
University of Houston alumni
C. E. Byrd High School alumni